The aureus ( aurei, 'golden', used as a noun) was a gold coin of ancient Rome originally valued at 25 pure silver denarii (sin. denarius). The aureus was regularly issued from the 1st century BC to the beginning of the 4th century AD, when it was replaced by the solidus. The aureus was about the same size as the denarius, but heavier due to the higher density of gold (as opposed to that of silver).

Before the time of Julius Caesar the aureus was struck infrequently.

At about the same time the purity of the silver coinage was also slightly decreased.

During the 3rd century, gold pieces were introduced in a variety of fractions and multiples, making it hard to determine the intended denomination of a gold coin.
During Gallienus's reign, the purity was briefly reduced to 94%, and a small amount of coins were minted with as low as 80% purity. This was reset back to 99% by the next emperor.

The solidus was first introduced by Diocletian (r. 284–305) around 301 AD, struck at 60 to the Roman pound of pure gold (and thus weighing about 5.5 g each) and with an initial value equal to 1,000 denarii.
However, Diocletian's solidus was struck only in small quantities, and thus had only minimal economic effect, although its stable weight brought an end to the instability that had existed for a while. Since only one document of Diocletian's time uses this word to describe the coin, numismatists usually reserve the name "solidus" for the coin that was introduced later by Constantine the Great.

When the solidus was reintroduced by Constantine I (r. 306–337) in 312 AD, permanently replacing the aureus as the gold coin of the Roman Empire, it was struck at a rate of 72 to a Roman pound of pure gold, each coin weighing twenty-four Greco-Roman carats, or about 4.5 grams of gold per coin. By this time, the solidus was worth 275,000 of the increasingly debased denarii.

However, regardless of the size or weight of the aureus, the coin's purity was little affected. Analysis of the Roman aureus shows the purity level usually to have been near to 24 karat gold, so in excess of 99% pure.

Due to runaway inflation caused by the Roman government's issuing base-metal coinage but refusing to accept anything other than silver or gold for tax payments, the value of the gold aureus in relation to the denarius grew drastically. Inflation was also affected by the systematic debasement of the silver denarius, which by the mid-3rd century had practically no silver left in it.

In 301, one gold aureus was worth 833⅓ denarii; by 324, the same aureus was worth 4,350 denarii. In 337, after Constantine converted to the solidus, one solidus was worth 275,000 denarii and finally, by 356, one solidus was worth 4,600,000 denarii.

Today, the aureus is highly sought after by collectors because of its purity and value, as well its historical interest. An aureus is usually much more expensive than a denarius issued by the same emperor. For instance, in one auction, an aureus of Trajan (r. 98–117) sold for $15,000, and a silver coin of the same emperor sold for $100. The most expensive aureus ever sold was one issued in 42 BC by Marcus Junius Brutus, the assassin of Gaius Julius Caesar, which had a price realized of $3.5 million in November 2020. (There is an example of this coin on permanent display at the British Museum in London.) An aureus, issued by the emperor Alexander Severus (r. 222–235), has a picture of the Colosseum on the reverse, and had a price realized of $920,000 in 2008. An aureus with the face of Allectus was auctioned off in the United Kingdom for £552,000 in June 2019.

See also

Roman currency
Coinage reform of Augustus

References

External links

Online numismatic exhibit: "This round gold is but the image of the rounder globe" (H.Melville). The charm of gold in ancient coinage

Coins of ancient Rome
Gold coins